Llévame Contigo ("Take Me With You") is the title of a studio album released by singer Olga Tañón on May 5, 1997. This album became her first number-one set on the Billboard Top Latin Albums and received a nomination for a Grammy Award for Best Traditional Tropical Latin Album and a Lo Nuestro Award for Tropical Salsa Album of the Year.

Track listing
The information from Billboard.

Chart performance

Weekly charts

Year-end charts

See also
List of number-one Billboard Top Latin Albums from the 1990s
List of number-one Billboard Tropical Albums from the 1990s
 Olga Tañón discography

References

1996 albums
Olga Tañón albums
Spanish-language albums
Warner Music Latina albums